Michael Gordon, better known by his stage name Mk.gee, is an American singer-songwriter, music producer, and multi-instrumentalist. His career began in 2017 with the song "I Know How You Get". He has since released three albums.

Life and career
Gordon is originally from southern New Jersey. His interest in music began when he was around 6 or 7 when he took piano lessons. When he was 11, he began to learn guitar. During high school, he joined a band with some of his schoolmates. However, Gordon preferred to play alone and began to record his own demos and play all the instruments by himself. After graduating high school, Gordon decided to move to Los Angeles and went to USC Thornton School of Music in order to further learn about music.

Gordon released his first song "I Know How You Get" in 2017. The song was then included on his debut album Pronounced McGee, released on May 18, 2018, along with three other singles "Roll with the Punches", "Over Here", and "You". In the same year, Gordon released his second album Fool on November 25, preceded by the single "New Year". On May 22, 2020, Gordon released his third album A Museum of Contradiction. The album was promoted by the single "cz", which was released on February 22, 2020. Rhys Buchanan, a writer from NME, praised the album, giving a four out of five stars rating, and wrote: "As acknowledged with the [album] title, this release merges genres from different worlds with both maturity and ease. Mk.gee is an artist with a natural ability to pair his emotional palette with vast musicality. A release that feels like an important stepping stone – you sense stardom is looming large here.

All three albums of Gordon have been home-produced by himself. Apart from producing songs for himself, Gordon has also produced for other artists, such as Omar Apollo and Dijon, for which he co-produced the former's mixtape Apolonio (2020) and the latter's debut album Absolutely (2021). In 2021, Gordon co-wrote the track "Fair Trade" by Drake featuring Travis Scott from the album Certified Lover Boy. In 2023, Gordon produced and co-wrote the track "Kids Are Growing Up (Part 1)" by The Kid Laroi from his upcoming debut album The First Time.

Discography

Albums

Singles

Songwriting and production credits

Artistry
Gordon's musical genres have been described as indie, alternative, lo-fi, and experimental indie. His musical influences include The Black Keys, Sly Stone, Larry Graham, Grouper, Julianna Barwick, and Down to Earth. Meanwhile, Gordon named Eric Clapton and Jimi Hendrix as the particular influences for him to learn to play guitar.

References

Living people
American singer-songwriters
American multi-instrumentalists
American record producers
American indie pop musicians
Singer-songwriters from Washington (state)
Songwriters from New Jersey
USC Thornton School of Music alumni
Interscope Records artists
Iamsound Records artists
Lo-fi musicians
Year of birth missing (living people)